Abu Dhabi Sakthi Award is a literary award instituted by UAE-based Abu Dhabi Sakthi Theatres and awarded to writers in Malayalam literature. Instituted in 1987, it is given in various categories such as novel, story, poetry, drama, literary criticism, scholarly literature and children's literature. The award for literary criticism is named Sakthi Thayat Award (after writer Thayat Sankaran, given since 1989), the award instituted for overall contributions is named T. K. Ramakrishnan Award (after communist politician T. K. Ramakrishnan, given since 2007), and the award for other categories of literature is named Sakthi Erumeli Award (after Erumeli Parameswaran Pillai, renamed since 2014).

List of recipients

References

Indian literary awards
Awards established in 1987
Malayalam literary awards
1987 establishments in the United Arab Emirates
Kerala awards